Leslie Charles "Larry" Leach (18 November 1909 Southend - 18 July 1996 Pietersburg) was a Rhodesian taxonomic botanist.

Leach arrived in Rhodesia in 1938 and carried on business in Salisbury as an electrical engineer. He developed an interest in succulent plants, particularly Stapelieae, Euphorbieae and the genus Aloe. He gave up the business world in 1956 and devoted himself to a self-financed taxonomic study of the three groups with a special interest in the "Flora Zambesiaca" region. He collected extensively in Mozambique and East Africa, also covering Angola, South West Africa and South Africa.

Between 1972-81 Leach worked as Honorary Botanist of the staff of Rhodesia's National Herbarium and described himself as 'probably Rhodesia's only unpaid civil servant'. He coerced the Aloe, Cactus and Succulent Society of Rhodesia into producing a taxonomic series supplementary to Excelsa. Consequently, four volumes, including monographs of the Stapelieae, Orbea, Stapelia, Huernia and Tridentea, were authored by Leach and published between 1978-88.

In 1981 he settled in South Africa, working at the National Botanic Garden at Worcester from 1982–89, and finishing his work on the succulent Stapelieae of Southern Africa, publishing the results in Excelsa.

From 1990 he worked as Honorary Research Fellow in the Department of Botany at the University of the North near Pietersburg, where, before his death, he worked on the succulent Euphorbieae for Flora Zambeziaca.

He was awarded the Harry Bolus Medal by the Botanical Society of Southern Africa in 1968, the Rhodesia Scientific Association's Gold Medal in 1977 and had fellowship of the Cactus and Succulent Society of America conferred in 1983.

He is commemorated in numerous specific names such as Aloe leachii Reynolds, Huernia leachii Lavranos, Dombeya leachii Wild, the Asclepiad genus Larryleachia and the Choreocolacaceae genus Leachiella Plowes. This botanist is denoted by the author abbreviation L.C.Leach when citing a botanical name.

References

External links
Cactus and Succulent Society of America official website
The Larry Leach Collection at the University of Limpopo

Rhodesian botanists
Rhodesian taxonomists
1909 births
1996 deaths
Botanists with author abbreviations
British emigrants to Rhodesia
White Rhodesian people
Zimbabwean people of English descent
People from Southend-on-Sea
20th-century British botanists